Townes may refer to:

People

Given name
 Townes Van Zandt (1944–1997),  American singer songwriter 
 Townes Van Zandt (album), eponymous album
 Townes (album), 2009 album by Steve Earle, dedicated to Townes Van Zandt

Surname
 Carol Lynn Townes, American gospel singer
 Charles Hard Townes (1915–2015), American Nobel Prize-winning physicist
 Harry Townes (1914–2001), American television and movie actor
 Henry Keith Townes (1913–1990), American entomologist
 Jeffrey Townes (born 1965), an American singer, more commonly known as DJ Jazzy Jeff
 Linton Townes (born 1959), American basketball player
 Marques Townes (born 1995), American basketball player
 Marvin Townes (born 1980), American football running back
 Sandra L. Townes (1944-2018), federal judge for the United States District Court for the Eastern District of New York
 Philip L. Townes, physician and human geneticist who identified Townes–Brocks syndrome

Other
 Townes (album), 2009 Steve Earle album

See also
 Towne, a surname (including a list of people with the name)
 Town (disambiguation)
 Towns (disambiguation)
 Autler–Townes effect, change in the absorption/emission spectra
Tonnes (name)

ja:タウンズ